Xu Xinchen is a Chinese wheelchair curler, .

Teams

References

External links 

Living people
Chinese male curlers
Chinese wheelchair curlers
World wheelchair curling champions
Year of birth missing (living people)
Place of birth missing (living people)
21st-century Chinese people